It Happened at the Inn (French: Goupi mains rouges) is a 1943 French mystery film directed by Jacques Becker and starring Fernand Ledoux, Robert Le Vigan, Georges Rollin and Blanchette Brunoy. It follows an investigation into the family members of an old woman who has been murdered. The film is based on the 1937 novel with the same title by Pierre Véry. It was released in France on 14 April 1943.

The film was shot at the Epinay Studios in Paris, with location filming taking place around Charente.

Cast
 Fernand Ledoux as Goupi-Mains rouges
 Robert Le Vigan as Goupi-Tonkin
 Georges Rollin as Goupi-Monsieur
 Blanchette Brunoy as Goupi-Muguet
 Arthur Devère as Goupi-Mes sous
 Germaine Kerjean as Goupi-Tisane
 Maurice Schutz as Goupi-L'Empereur
 Guy Favières as Goupi-La Loi
 Marcelle Hainia as Goupi-Cancan
 René Génin as Goupi-Dicton
 Albert Rémy as Jean des Goupis
 Line Noro as Marie des Goupis
 Marcel Pérès as Eusèbe, le gendarme
 Louis Seigner as L'instituteur
 Pierre Labry as Minain
 Maurice Marceau as Un porteur à la gare

References

Bibliography
 Slide, Anthony. Selected Film Criticism: Foreign Films, 1930-1950. Scarecrow Press, 1984.

External links
 https://www.imdb.com/title/tt0035951/?ref_=fn_al_tt_1

1940s mystery drama films
1943 films
Films based on French novels
Films based on works by Pierre Véry
Films directed by Jacques Becker
French mystery drama films
1940s French-language films
French black-and-white films
1943 drama films
1940s French films